Girls' Byte CII class competition at the 2010 Summer Youth Olympics in Singapore took place from August 17 to August 25 at the  National Sailing Centre. 32 sailors competed in this dinghy competition.

Sixteen races were scheduled however, due to bad weather conditions, only 11 races plus the Medal race were contested. Only the 9 best results along with the Medal race result were totaled for the final results.

Medalists

Results

Race M is the medal race.

Notes
Scoring abbreviations are defined as follows:
 OCS – On the Course Side of the starting line
 DSQ – Disqualified
 DNF – Did Not Finish
 DNS – Did Not Start
 BFD – Black Flag Disqualification
 RAF – Retired after Finishing

References

 Fleet Overall

Sailing at the 2010 Summer Youth Olympics
Byte CII competitions
Youth